Charles William Gordon (19 March 1817 – 15 June 1863) was a British army officer and Conservative politician. He was a captain in the Madras Light Infantry. He was the son of Charles Gordon of Fyvie Castle, a son of Alexander Gordon, Lord Rockville.

Gordon contested the 1857 general election, but was only elected Conservative MP for Berwick-upon-Tweed at the 1859 general election and held the seat until his death in 1863.

References

External links
 

1817 births
1863 deaths
UK MPs 1859–1865
Conservative Party (UK) MPs for English constituencies